The Sheep Hole Mountains are a mountain range in the Mojave Desert, to the north of Joshua Tree National Park, in San Bernardino County, California. The mountains were once Chemehuevi hunting grounds.

The mountain range lies between the Bullion Mountains to the west, and the Coxcomb Mountains to the east.

Sheephole Valley Wilderness Area
The Bureau of Land Management designated and manages the Sheephole Valley Wilderness Area which is within the mountain range and Mojave Trails National Monument.  The 194,861-acre (approximate) Sheephole Valley Wilderness is a perfect representation of the basin and range topography typical in the Mojave Desert. The area consists of the northwest to southeast trending granitic boulder strewn Sheep Hole and Calumet Mountains, and is adjacent to the northern boundary of Joshua Tree National Park.

References

California Road and Recreation Atlas, 2005, p. 106 & 112

External links
Official Sheephole Valley Wilderness Area website
Sheephole Valley Wilderness photographs
Sheephole Valley Wilderness Area Map
Bird Checklist for Joshua Tree National Park

Mountain ranges of the Mojave Desert
Mountain ranges of San Bernardino County, California
Mojave Trails National Monument
Protected areas of the Mojave Desert
Protected areas of San Bernardino County, California
Bureau of Land Management areas in California
Mountain ranges of Southern California